The Awareness Foundation, formerly the Trinity Foundation for Christianity and Culture, is a Christian charity that was established in 2003. The Duchess of Edinburgh GCVO is their Royal Patron.  Their Founding Patron was Rowan Williams, Archbishop of Canterbury; they now have a College of Patrons, including Williams, Charles Cadogan, 8th Earl Cadogan, Anba Angaelos, Christopher Cocksworth, Paul Kwong and Kevin McDonald. Leslie Griffiths is a former Patron. The Awareness Foundation is based in London, the UK, with supporters in North America, the Middle East, and Hong Kong.

History
The Trinity Foundation for Christianity and Culture (TFCC) was launched in September 2003 by Rowan Williams, Archbishop of Canterbury, at a service at Holy Trinity, Sloane Street church. Co-founders Bishop Michael Marshall was rector of Holy Trinity from 1997 to 2007, and Nadim Nassar was an assistant curate in the parish. The charity was later renamed the Awareness Foundation.

Purpose and composition
The Foundation states that "The Awareness Foundation builds peace through empowering people in the Middle East and the West to use their faith as a means to bring reconciliation and understanding, driving out mistrust and hostility.".

Middle East:
Awareness Foundation Middle East is headed by Huda Nassar. It has two main missions: it "builds up understanding between the East and the West" and "strengthens and sustains Christians in the Middle East".
Core projects include:
 Ambassadors for Peace: The Awareness Foundation trains young people in Syria and Iraq to become 'Ambassadors for Peace' in their community. So far, "over 700 young people have begun their journey to become Ambassadors for Peace, and much peace-building projects are now in development, including a center offering first aid training, a program to rehabilitate vulnerable street children, and an ecumenical dialogue project."
 Little Heroes: The Awareness Foundation states on its website, "In 2015, we decided to invite 200 (displaced children) to a special three-day Summer School to plant the seeds of love, trust, hope, and joy in their hearts so that they could overcome all they have faced and play an active role in their new homes, schools, and communities. ... Our Summer School inspired the children through group activities, celebrations, Bible Study, and prayer. ... Over the course of the Summer School, the children talked, perhaps for the first time, about their sense of loss - of home, of family members, their school friends, even toys and other possessions. They started to trust again, to smile and laugh, and to make new friends." "Our Little Heroes program has already helped more than 2,000 displaced children in Syria to give them a new hope and new energy to live their life without fear. This enables them to build new bridges of respect and understanding with children of other faiths that they meet in their new homes and schools."
Rest of the World:

 PAX, a new programme, is "a growing online collection of short yet challenging faith-based videos." The program's goals are described as "Through discussion of topics such as politics and faith, interfaith relationships, and how to combat extremism, PAX seeks to build peace by insisting upon compassion and respect. We are passionate about equipping communities and individuals to recognise the world-changing power of a living faith. Our videos demonstrate an authentic and relevant Christianity that celebrates diversity and provides an answer to extremism and hatred."
 The Awareness Forum, which consists of special events such as dinners, conferences, roundtable exchanges, and lectures, focuses on the religious and cultural issues of the day. For example, in 2018, an international conference was held in London.
 Facing Faith, another program, is described by the Foundation as "A community-based initiative to promote peace and understanding across barriers of faith & culture"; it works by "bringing together community and faith leaders from different religions and cultures to discuss ideas and share their thoughts on how to promote better understanding and respect among the diverse communities that live alongside each other in cities and towns around Great Britain. Each event helps faith and community leaders to enable local communities to decide upon effective joint activities and programmes for the future."

The Awareness Foundation is ecumenical, with board members from the Roman Catholic Church, the Church of England, and the Episcopal Church in the US and the Middle East, the Greek Orthodox Church, Presbyterian, Methodist and Baptist Churches, plus several charismatic evangelical churches.

Personnel
Nadim Nassar is an Executive Director. He is co-founder of the Awareness Foundation, along with Michael Marshall (President Emeritus of the Awareness Foundation). Nassar's first book, The Culture of God, was published by Hodder in 2018. He has been a guest blogger on the UK website of The Daily Telegraph, and both Marshall and Nassar have spoken around the world. Charles Longbottom was the Founding Chair of Trustees.

References

Christian education
Christian ecumenical organizations
Christian charities based in the United Kingdom
Organizations established in 2003